The lazy user model of solution selection (LUM) is a model in information systems proposed by Tétard and Collan that tries to explain how an individual selects a solution to fulfill a need from a set of possible solution alternatives. LUM expects that a solution is selected from a set of available solutions based on the amount of effort the solutions require from the user – the user is supposed to select the solution that carries the least effort. The model is applicable to a number of different types of situations, but it can be said to be closely related to technology acceptance models.

The model draws from earlier works on how least effort affects human behaviour in information seeking and in scaling of language.

Earlier research within the discipline of information systems especially within the topic of technology acceptance and technology adoption is closely related to the lazy user model.

The model structure
The model starts from the observation that there is a "user need", i.e. it is expected that there is a "clearly definiable, fully satisfiable want" that the user wants satisfied (it can also be said that the user has a problem that he/she wants solved). So there is a place for a solution, product, or service.

The user need defines the set of possible solutions (products, services etc.) that fulfill the user need. The basic model considers for simplicity needs that are 100% satisfiable and services that 100% satisfy the needs. This means that only the solutions that solve the problem are relevant. This logically means that the need defines the possible satisfying solutions – a set of solutions (many different products/services) that all can fulfill the user need. LUM is not limited to looking at one solution separately.

All of the solutions in the set that fulfill the need have their own characteristics; some are good and suitable for the user, others unsuitable and unacceptable – for example, if the user is in a train and wants to know what the result from a tennis match is right now, he/she may only use the types of solutions to the problem that are available to him/her. The "user state" determines the set of available/suitable solutions for the user and thus limits the (available) set of possible solutions to fulfill the user need. The user state is a very wide concept, it is the user characteristics at the time of the need. The user state includes, e.g., age, wealth, location ... everything that determines the state of the user in relation to the solutions in the set of the possible solutions to fulfill the user need.

The model supposes that after the user need has defined the set of possible solutions that fulfill the user need and the user state has limited the set to the available plausible solutions that fulfill the user need the user will "select" a solution from the set to fulfill the need. Obviously if the set is empty the user does not have a way to fulfill the need. The lazy user model assumes that the user will make the selection from the limited set based on the lowest level of effort. Effort is understood as the combination of monetary cost + time needed + physical/mental effort needed.

Considerations
The lazy user theory has implications when thinking about the effect of learning in technology adoption (for example in the adoption of new information systems).

See also
 Diffusion of innovations
 Technology acceptance model
 Technology adoption lifecycle
 Theory of planned behavior
 Unified theory of acceptance and use of technology

References

External links
 

Behavior